The BSA Thunderbolt was a British motorcycle made by BSA at their factory in Armoury Road in Small Heath, Birmingham between 1962 and 1972.

Development
The BSA Thunderbolt was designed as a touring motorcycle.

The BSA development team decided to keep costs down by re-using the well proven single sided front brake from the BSA Gold Star and the same full race camshaft as the BSA Lightning.

From 1968 the Thunderbolt benefited from a number of minor improvements including a longer kick start to make starting easier and metal tank badges to replace the earlier plastic ones, which had a tendency to crack. An Amal Concentric carburettor dealt with the problems of fuel flooding experienced with the earlier monobloc carburettor, by having the float bowl arranged centrally around (concentric with, hence the name) the main jet to remove the sensitivity to fuel surge inherent in all the earlier designs. Stiffer suspension improved cornering but poor quality control and production problems on the BSA assembly line with later models led to oil leaks and rusting parts which damaged the reputation of the Thunderbolt, which was already struggling to compete against the emerging Japanese motorcycles of the early 1970s (such as the Honda CB750) and production ended in 1972.

T65 Thunderbolt
In order to fulfil existing export orders after production of the BSA twins had stopped, between 200 and 300 Triumph TR6 Trophys were rebadged as BSA T65 Thunderbolt and exported to Spain and Australia.

See also
 Birmingham Small Arms Company

References

Thunderbolt
Motorcycles introduced in 1964